Fuente Obejuna is a Spanish town in the province of Córdoba, autonomous community of Andalusia. The municipality has a population of around 5,000 inhabitants.
Fuente Obejuna is located 98 km from the provincial capital, Córdoba. It was made famous by Lope de Vega's play Fuenteovejuna about the uprising that took place there in 1476.

Etymology
Although Fuente Obejuna is the official name, the town is also known as Fuente Ovejuna and Fuenteovejuna. Before the creation of the Real Academia Española, the use of "b" and "v" was different from what it is today, and because of that fact Fuente Obejuna can be written in several ways,  Some people have related the name of this town to the Roman villa Fons Mellaria ("honey fountain", whence the Spanish demonym mellarienses) that was situated in the municipality of Fuente Obejuna, 5 km from the urban area, at Masatrigos hill, a place where Roman remains have been found. From this name Fuente Abejuna ("bee fountain") was derived and then Fuente Obejuna.

Demography
There are 14 pedanías that belong to Fuente Obejuna's municipality:
 Alcornocal
 Argallón
 Cañada del Gamo
 La Cardenchosa
 Coronada
 Cuenca
 Los Morenos
 Navalcuervo
 Ojuelos Altos
 Ojuelos Bajos
 Los Pánchez
 Piconcillo
 El Porvenir
 Posadilla

Number of residents in 1996-2006:

See also
Fuenteovejuna

References

External links

Fuente Obejuna - Sistema de Información Multiterritorial de Andalucía

Municipalities in the Province of Córdoba (Spain)